Christopher Andrew Langat is a Kenyan politician who is the former senator for Bomet County. He is a member of the Jubilee Party.

He attended the University of Nairobi and Moi University where he obtained a PhD in education.

In 2020 he was appointed to the senate's COVID-19 committee following the resignation of senator Johnson Sakaja

Electoral history

WTCemployment history
2016-March 2017 he worked in Moi University (Bomet college Campus) as the Dean, School of Human Resource Development

References 

 

Living people
Members of the Senate of Kenya
University of Nairobi alumni
Moi University alumni
Year of birth missing (living people)